Cooran railway station is located on the North Coast line in Queensland, Australia. It serves the town of Cooran in the Shire of Noosa.

History
Cooran railway station opened on 10 June 1889 with the opening of the line from Gympie. It was the terminus of the line until it was extended south to Cooroy on 1 April 1891.

The station today consists of one platform with a steel shelter. In 2009, the platform was extended at its southern end with scaffolding and plywood materials. Initially intended as an interim arrangement until a permanent extension was built, the temporary platform remained until December 2018. Opposite the platform lies a passing loop. Queensland Rail has commenced the reconstruction of the station platform and shelter, with work on the new, permanent structure that was completed by the end of December 2018.

Services
Cooran is serviced by two daily City network services in each direction.

Services by platform

Transport links
Sunbus' route 632 to Noosa Junction serves Cooran station, but none of its services are timed to connect with train services.

References

External links

Cooran station Queensland Rail
Cooran station Queensland's Railways on the Internet

North Coast railway line, Queensland
Railway stations in Noosa Shire
Railway stations in Australia opened in 1889